Wądroże Małe  is a village in the administrative district of Gmina Wądroże Wielkie, within Jawor County, Lower Silesian Voivodeship, in south-western Poland. The village has a population of 200.

References

Villages in Jawor County